Puerto Rico Highway 104 (PR-104) is a rural road located in Mayagüez, Puerto Rico. This highway begins at its intersection with PR-2 and PR-3108 in Miradero and ends at its junction with PR-2 in Algarrobos.

Major intersections

See also

 List of highways numbered 104

References

External links
 

104
Roads in Mayagüez, Puerto Rico